Musawi may refer to:
Abbas al-Musawi (c. 1952 – 1992), influential Muslim cleric and leader of Hezbollah
Abd al-Husayn Sharaf al-Din al-Musawi, Shi'a twelver Islamic scholar
Husayn Al-Musawi (also Hussein Musawi), a Lebanese Shia who founded the now-dissolved pro-Iranian Islamist militia Islamic Amal in 1982
Mousavi is a surname
Moosavi is a patronymic, common among Shi'a Muslims
Mosavi, Iran, a village in Iran